Leukemia cutis is the infiltration of neoplastic leukocytes or their precursors into the skin resulting in clinically identifiable cutaneous lesions. This condition may be contrasted with leukemids, which are skin lesions that occur with leukemia, but which are not related to leukemic cell infiltration.
Leukemia cutis can occur in most forms of leukemia, including chronic myeloid leukemia, acute lymphoblastic leukemia, chronic lymphocytic leukemia, acute myeloid leukemia, and prolymphocytic leukemia.

See also 
 Granulocytic sarcoma
 List of cutaneous conditions

References

External links 

 
Lymphoid-related cutaneous conditions